Shilow Tracey (born 29 April 1998) is an English professional footballer who plays as a winger for  League One club  Cambridge United.

Career
Tracey began his career at Ebbsfleet United and made a single appearance for them in the Kent Senior Cup against Charlton Athletic.

Tottenham Hotspur
In the 2016 winter transfer window Tracey moved to Tottenham for an undisclosed fee. Paul Prederville reviewed the player for Sky Sports quoting that Tracey is "Quick and strong, his performances for the Ebbsfleet youth team have drawn similarities with Yaya Toure". In July, 2018 Tracey signed a new contract committing to the club until 2020. In January 2020 he went out on loan to Macclesfield Town of League Two. On 8 February 2020 he made his football league debut away at Leyton Orient which ended 1–1.

On 18 February, Tracey scored his first professional league goal in a 1–1 draw against Plymouth Argyle.

On 18 September 2020, Tracey joined League One side Shrewsbury Town on loan for the 2020–21 season. He scored his first goals for Shrewsbury on 10 November 2020 when he scored a hat-trick in an EFL Trophy group game against Crewe Alexandra. On 25 January 2021, Tracey joined League Two side Cambridge United on loan for the remainder of the 2020–21 season.

Cambridge United

On 17 June 2021, Tracey signed a 2-year deal with  Cambridge United.

Career statistics

References

1998 births
Living people
English footballers
Ebbsfleet United F.C. players
Tottenham Hotspur F.C. players
Macclesfield Town F.C. players
Shrewsbury Town F.C. players
Cambridge United F.C. players
English Football League players
Association football wingers
Black British sportspeople
Footballers from the London Borough of Newham